Danny Schwarz (born 11 May 1975) is a German football coach and former player who last coached Würzburger Kickers. He played as a defensive midfielder. He is loan player manager at FC Bayern Munich.

Playing career

Schwarz was born in Göppingen. He played for VfB Stuttgart between the 1995–96 season and 1997–98 season, Karlsruher SC during the 1998–99 season, SpVgg Unterhaching between the 1999–2000 season and the 2001–02 season, and 1860 Munich during the 2002–03 season and 2003–04 season. He returns to Karlsruhe and 1860 Munich. He also played for the reserve team. He finished his playing career at Bayern Munich II.

Coaching career
He was interim head coach for Bayern's reserve team from 23 March 2017 until the end of the season. He finished with a record of five wins and four draws in nine matches. He currently is managing the under-17 team of Bayern Munich. On 2 April 2021, Bayern Munich announced that Schwarz and Martín Demichelis would replace Holger Seitz as Bayern's reserve team manager. Bayern also announced that Seitz's last match would be against VfB Lübeck on 3 April 2021. On 13 October 2021, he was appointed as the new head coach of Würzburger Kickers. He was sacked on 10 February 2022.

Career statistics

Club

Managerial record

1.Bayern Munich stated Danny Schwarz is co-manager with Martin Demichelis.

Honours
DFB-Pokal: 1996–97

References

External links

German footballers
Germany under-21 international footballers
Germany B international footballers
1975 births
Living people
VfB Stuttgart players
VfB Stuttgart II players
Karlsruher SC players
SpVgg Unterhaching players
TSV 1860 Munich players
FC Bayern Munich II players
Association football midfielders
Bundesliga players
2. Bundesliga players
3. Liga players
Regionalliga players
FC Bayern Munich non-playing staff
FC Bayern Munich II managers
Würzburger Kickers managers
3. Liga managers
German football managers
People from Göppingen
Sportspeople from Stuttgart (region)
Footballers from Baden-Württemberg
West German footballers